Propionicicella superfundia is a Gram-positive, facultative anaerobic, rod-shaped and non-motile bacterium which has been isolated from groundwater which was contaminated with chlorosolvents and petroleum hydrocarbons in Baton Rouge in the United States.

References 

Propionibacteriales
Bacteria described in 2006
Monotypic bacteria genera